Coptodisca cercocarpella, the curl-leaf mountain mahogany leafminer, is a moth of the family Heliozelidae. It was described by Annette Frances Braun in 1925. It is found in North America, including Arizona, California, Utah and Colorado.

References

Heliozelidae
Leaf miners
Moths described in 1925